The Synodal Path ( or Synodaler Weg, sometimes translated as Synodal Way) is a series of conferences of the Catholic Church in Germany to discuss a range of contemporary theological and organizational questions concerning the Catholic Church, as well as possible reactions to the sexual abuse crisis in the Catholic Church in Germany.

Organization

The Synodal Path's supreme body is the Synodal Assembly. It consists of 230 members, made up of archbishops, bishops and auxiliary bishops, as well as an equal number of lay-members from the Central Committee of German Catholics. This number is further increased by representatives of religious orders or other ecclesial groups.

The Synodal Path is further divided into four Synodal Forums that each focus on a particular topic:
 Power and Separation of Powers in the Church - Joint Participation and Involvement in the Mission
 Life in succeeding relationships - Living Love in Sexuality and Partnership
 Priestly Existence Today
 Women in Ministries and Offices in the Church

An ongoing discussion is the relationship or precedence between the German Synodal Path and the international "Synod on Synodality", which was started by Pope Francis in 2021.

Meetings
The Synodal Path commenced on 1 December 2019. It is scheduled to end in 2023.

The first meeting took place from 30 January to 1 February 2020.  Due to construction works in Frankfurt Cathedral the initial meeting could not convene there as originally planned and had to move to a former monastery which usually serves as a Protestant convention center.  The following proper conference took place from 30 September to 2 October 2021, but was ended prematurely before being able to vote on all proposed topics, due to too many members departing the assembly early. 

The next conference, which was held from 3 to 5 February 2022 at the conference center of the Messe Frankfurt, was the first one to decide on the results of the Synodal Path.  The majority of the assembly, some of whom displayed LGBT pride flags, endorsed the following propositions:
 Women's ordination should be allowed by the Vatican.
 The laity should have more influence on the election of bishops.
 Homosexual partnerships/unions should get a public blessing ceremony.
 The Roman Catholic catechism's teachings on sexual ethics should be reformed. Homosexual sexual acts within same-sex unions/partnerships should be theologically accepted and not classified as a sinful behaviour.
 Married priests (viri probati) should be allowed.
 There should be changes to the labour laws of the German church to prohibit the firing or refusal to hire of people based on marital status.

On September 9, 2022 a text to the position of women in Roman Catholic Church and a document "New teaching over Homosexuality in Catechism of the Catholic Church" was supported, and in a third document was a reform of Roman Catholic Church labour law for homosexual workers supported. 

During its last meeting, from 9 to 11 March 2023, the Synodal Path approved the blessing of same-sex unions, the normalisation of lay people preaching, a guideline of "concrete improvements for intersex and transgender faithful", and requests to reexamine the Catholic Church's stance on clerical celibacy and on women's ordination.

Reception

The Synodal Path has drawn a range of criticism and support both domestically and internationally. Support comes for example by Italian bishop , while criticism comes for example from Archbishop Cordileone of San Francisco.

A common topic is a perceived lack of fidelity to the established doctrines of the Catholic Church, e.g. due to the refusal of the Synodal Assembly to rule out decisions that run counter to Catholic doctrines. Another common criticism concerns over the legitimacy of the organizational form chosen as the Synodal Path is not using an established organisational form sanctioned by canon law.

On 29 June 2019 Pope Francis wrote a letter "To the Pilgrim People of God in Germany". The letter supported synodal deliberations but also called for a focus of evangelization over pure reorganization. Consecutive attempts by some German bishops to redirect the Synodal Path towards "evangelization" were declined.

In early September 2019 Cardinal Marc Ouellet  of the Roman Curia's Congregation for Bishops sent a letter to the German Bishops' Conference to warn them that the organizational structure chosen by the Synodal Path was invalid and could not make binding decisions about some of its key topics.

On 21 September 2019, prior to the start of the Synodal Path, Professor  of the University of Vienna and a member of the International Theological Commission resigned from her planned role in the Synodal Forum "Women in Ministries and Offices in the Church" citing the forum's "fixation on ordination" of women.

On 28 May 2020 Auxiliary Bishop  of the Archdiocese of Cologne resigned from his position in the Synodal Forum "Life in Successful Relationships" in protest to the forum's view on sexual morality which he claimed contradicted the Catholic Church's view as stated in Humanae vitae.

Prior to the Regional Conferences on 4 September 2020, Bishop Rudolf Voderholzer of Regensburg criticized the conference's working papers in an open letter, dated 2 September. Points criticized included the creation of the working papers which he said deviated from the agreed upon procedure, leaving the participants no room for comment prior to the conference, as well as the papers' one-sided biblical theology, despite earlier agreements to leave biblical theology for later meetings.

During a general audience held 25 November 2020, Pope Francis commented on people gathering in "a synodal path" and warned that they were lacking the Holy Spirit.  While not directed officially at the Synodal Path, the statement was widely considered to refer to Germany.

In June 2022 the results of national synodal paths in the Netherlands were nearly the same: women ordination, married priests and reform of world catechism in sexual ethics were supported.

On 21 July 2022, the Holy See released a statement in which it stated that "The 'Synodal Way' in Germany does not have the power to compel bishops and the faithful to adopt new forms of governance and new orientations of doctrine and morals".

In August 2022, the results of nationals synodal paths in Switzerland and in Austria were nearly the same: women ordination, married priests and reform of world catechism in sexual ethics were supported.

In November 2022, Roman catholic church in Germany reformed church labour law. Homosexual priests/bishops can out themselves as gay. They do not fear longer a termination. Homosexual workers at Roman catholic church can do a same-sex marriage

Roman Curia in November 2022 

The Vatican published on Nov 24 2022 the critiques of Cardinal Ouellet, and Cardinal Luis Ladaria Ferrer, prefect of the Dicastery for the Doctrine of the Faith.

Ouellet, after praising the seriousness of the Germans in tackling sexual abuse, referred to “serious difficulties from an anthropological, pastoral, and ecclesiological point of view" in the proposals of the Germans. He said they were making “concessions” under “very strong cultural and media pressure.” It is striking, however, that the agenda of a limited group of theologians from a few decades ago has suddenly become the majority proposal of the German episcopate." "It is difficult to avoid the impression that the extremely serious matter of the abuse cases has been exploited to push through other ideas not directly related to it.” These are "proposals that openly contradict the teaching affirmed by all the popes since the Second Vatican Ecumenical Council.

Ladaria warned the Germans of “reducing the mystery of the Church to a mere institution of power, or viewing the Church from the outset as a structurally abusive organization that must be brought under the control of superintendents as quickly as possible.” “In this respect, the greatest danger of many operative proposals of the synodal way’s texts is that one of the most important achievements of the Second Vatican Council is lost, namely the clear teaching of the mission of the bishops and thus of the local Church."

Bätzing response
Bishop Georg Bätzing stated:

Pope Francis criticism in January 2023
On January 2023, in an interview with AP, Pope Francis warned that the German Synodal Path is both "elitist" and "ideological." He also said that is neither helpful nor serious, and contrasted it with the worldwide Synod on Synodality. He urged that the Church "be patient, dialogue and accompany these people on the real synodal path" and to "help this more elitist [German] path so that it does not end badly in some way, but so is also integrated into the church."

See also 

 Synod on synodality
 Synodality

References

Further reading

External links 

 Official website

Catholic Church in Germany
LGBT and Catholicism